The Austrian Rugby Federation is the governing body for rugby union in Austria.

The first documented game of rugby played in Austria occurred on April 14, 1912. The sport was being brought to Austria by two Englishmen hoping to expand the sports base. It was over sixty years, however, before rugby union took hold in Austria.

Vienna Celtic RFC was founded in 1978 and was the first rugby union club founded in Austria. The ÖRV was founded in 1990 and joined the International Rugby Board in 1992.

List of presidents
Thomas Gabriel (2001–2003)
Paul Duteil (2003-2007)
Andreas Schwab (2007-present)

List of vice presidents
Wolfgang Roehrer (2003-2007)
Renee Carmine-Jones (2007-present)

General secretary
Alexandra Langer-Hansel (2003-present)

National league coordinator
Martin Puchinger (2008-present)

Women's rugby development officer
Renee Carmine-Jones (2003-present)

Training and education coordinator
Renee Carmine-Jones (2007-present)

See also
Rugby union in Austria
Austria national rugby union team

References

External links
 Österreichischer Rugby Verband - Official site 
 Women's Rugby Austria - Official site 

 
Rugby union governing bodies in Europe
Rugby
Sports organizations established in 1990
1990 establishments in Austria